Chester Smith Barnard (October 25, 1894 – October 16, 1952) was an American football player and coach of football and basketball.  He served as the head football coach at the University of Mississippi in 1924 and at Kalamazoo College from 1925 to 1941, compiling a career college football record of 67–59–17. He was a twin brother of Lester Barnard.

Coaching career
Barnard was the head football coach at Kalamazoo College in Kalamazoo, Michigan.  He held that position for 17 seasons, from 1925 until 1941. His coaching record at Kalamazoo was 63–54–17.  Barnard left Kalamazoo in 1942 to join the United States Navy.

Death
Barnard committed suicide in 1952 by drowning in the Gasconade River.

Head coaching record

Football

References

External links
 

1894 births
1952 suicides
American football ends
American men's basketball players
Great Lakes Navy Bluejackets football players
Kalamazoo Hornets athletic directors
Kalamazoo Hornets football coaches
Kalamazoo Hornets men's basketball coaches
Missouri S&T Miners football coaches
Missouri State Bears basketball players
Missouri State Bears football players
Northwestern Wildcats football players
Ole Miss Rebels football coaches
College swimming coaches in the United States
College track and field coaches in the United States
United States Navy personnel of World War II
Basketball coaches from Missouri
United States Navy officers
West Virginia University alumni
People from Rogersville, Missouri
Suicides by drowning in the United States
Suicides in Missouri